Air Hitam is a mukim in Muar District, Johor, Malaysia. The mukim spans over an area of 118 square km, with a population estimated at 7,695. The main town in this mukim is Bukit Naning.

See also
 Districts of Malaysia

References

Mukims of Muar District